Sports in Minnesota include professional teams in all major sports, Olympic Games contenders and medalists, especially in the Winter Olympics, collegiate teams in major and small-school conferences and associations and active amateur teams and individual sports. The State of Minnesota has a team in all five major professional leagues (Major League Baseball, National Football League, National Basketball Association, National Hockey League and Major League Soccer). Along with professional sports, there are numerous collegiate teams including the University of Minnesota Golden Gophers and St. Thomas Tommies in NCAA Division I, as well as many others across the Minnesota public and private colleges and universities.

Major professional sports

Baseball

The Minnesota Twins are an MLB team that moved to Minnesota in 1961 from Washington D.C., where they were known as the Washington Senators. The Twins played their home games at Metropolitan Stadium in Bloomington from 1961 to 1981 and the Metrodome in Minneapolis from 1982 to 2009, moving to their current stadium, Target Field, in 2010. They have been to the World Series in 1965, 1987 and 1991, winning in 1987 and 1991. In 2001, the Twins and the Montreal Expos were threatened with closure in a contraction scheme of the Commissioner of Baseball.  That effort was unsuccessful, and the next year the team made it to the American League Championship Series (ALCS). Notable current and former Twins include Kirby Puckett, Bert Blyleven, Rod Carew, Tony Oliva, Harmon Killebrew, Paul Molitor, Johan Santana, Joe Mauer, Justin Morneau, Torii Hunter, Joe Nathan, David Ortiz and Kent Hrbek. There is a Minor League Baseball team based in St Paul called the St Paul Saints.

The current St. Paul Saints are the Minnesota Twins AAA affiliate team. The team used to be part of the Northern League. The team was founded in 1993 as an inaugural team in the league.  They won the Northern League Championship in 1993, 1995, 1996, and in 2004. Notable current and former players include Kevin Millar, Darryl Strawberry, Jason Varitek, Jack Morris, and Ila Borders.  The Saints play their home games at CHS Field in St. Paul and are the current Triple-A affiliate of Major League Baseball's Minnesota Twins. They moved to downtown St Paul in time for the 2015 season, to start play at the new CHS Field.

Basketball

The Minnesota Lynx are a Women's National Basketball Association (WNBA) team founded in 1999 and play their home games at Target Center in Minneapolis. The Lynx have won four WNBA Championships, doing so during the 2011, 2013, 2015 and 2017 season. In 2005, the Lynx drafted Seimone Augustus from Louisiana State University. She quickly became the foundation of the franchise and has been the focus of many WNBA advertisements. Maya Moore, drafted first overall in 2011, has contributed in great part to the Lynx's success, winning an MVP award in 2014.

The Minnesota Timberwolves are an NBA team founded in 1989 and play their home games at Target Center in Minneapolis. The "Wolves", as they are called by fans, have yet to appear in an NBA Finals series, but made it to the Western Conference Finals in 2004. In 2000, NBA officials ruled that the Wolves violated league rules when signing then-free agent Joe Smith. They then declared the contract was henceforth invalid, fined the organization $3.5 million and took the team's next three first-round draft picks.  Notable current and former players include Kevin Garnett, Kevin Love, Sam Cassell, Karl-Anthony Towns, Ricky Rubio, Stephon Marbury, Latrell Sprewell, Terry Porter, Sam Mitchell, Wally Szczerbiak, Malik Sealy and Andrew Wiggins.

The Minneapolis Lakers were an NBA team that was moved from Detroit to Minneapolis in 1947. Eventually in 1960, the Lakers moved to Los Angeles, where they became the Los Angeles Lakers. During their stay, the Minneapolis Lakers won the 1947–48 National Basketball League (NBL) championship, then joined four other NBL teams in joining the Basketball Association of America (BAA), where they won the 1948–49 BAA championship. After the 1948–49 season, the NBL and the BAA merged to become the NBA. The Lakers then won five championships in six years, in 1949, 1950, 1952, 1953 and 1954. They are considered to be the NBA's first "dynasty". Notable players include George Mikan, Jim Pollard, Vern Mikkelsen, Slater Martin, Clyde Lovellette and Elgin Baylor.

Football

The Minnesota Vikings are an NFL team founded as an expansion team in 1961. They play their home games at U.S. Bank Stadium. The Vikings have won one NFL Championship in 1969, one year before the AFL–NFL Merger. The Vikings were the first team to appear in four Super Bowls, but also lost all of them. Their last appearance in the Super Bowl was Super Bowl XI against the Oakland Raiders in 1977. Notable current and former players include Warren Moon, Randall Cunningham, Jim Marshall, Ron Yary, Mick Tingelhoff, Paul Krause, Cris Carter, Carl Eller, Fran Tarkenton, Chuck Foreman, Randy Moss, Daunte Culpepper, Darren Sharper, Jim Kleinsasser, Brad Johnson, Alan Page, the "Purple People Eaters", Adrian Peterson, Randall McDaniel, John Randle among others

Before the Vikings, Minnesota also hosted the Minneapolis Marines/Red Jackets and the Duluth Kelleys/Eskimos. Three players who played for Duluth are in the Pro Football Hall of Fame. The Duluth teams played at Athletic Park, while the Minneapolis teams played at Nicollet Park. In 2014, the Bemidji Axemen of Bemidji played two seasons as a team in the Indoor Football League.

The Minnesota Vixen are a Women's American Football team (WFA) founded in 1998. They are also the oldest professional women's football team in the U.S.
The Minnesota Machine are also a Women's American Football team (WFA) founded in 2008.

Ice Hockey

The Minnesota Wild are an NHL team founded in 2000 and play their home games at the Xcel Energy Center in Saint Paul. The Wild have not appeared in the Stanley Cup Finals. With their second draft pick in franchise history, the Wild drafted Mikko Koivu, who now holds the team's record total franchise points and is team captain. The Wild made it to the Western Conference Finals in 2003, by beating the Colorado Avalanche and Vancouver Canucks both in seven games after being down three games to one in the series, before being swept by the then Mighty Ducks of Anaheim. Notable Wild players include Marián Gáborík, Mikko Koivu, Wes Walz, Darby Hendrickson, Zach Parise, Ryan Suter, Thomas Vanek, Eric Staal, and Jordan Leopold.

The Minnesota North Stars were an NHL team that was part of the 1967 NHL Expansion and played their home games at Met Center in Bloomington. They appeared in the 1981 and 1991 Stanley Cup Finals, but did not win either one of them. In 1993, the North Stars moved to Dallas, where they became the Dallas Stars. Notable players include Harry Howell, John Mariucci, Gump Worsley, Neal Broten and Mike Modano.

The Minnesota Whitecaps are a professional women's team that played in the amateur Western Women's Hockey League (WWHL) from 2004 to 2011 and joined the professional Premier Hockey Federation (PHF, formerly the National Women's Hockey League, or NWHL) for the 2018–19 season as an expansion team. The team has one Clarkson Cup title from 2010 during their time in the WWHL and an Isobel Cup in the PHF. They play at Richfield Ice Arena in Richfield.

The U.S. Hockey Hall of Fame is located in Eveleth, on the Iron Range.

Soccer

Minnesota United FC is a Major League Soccer team that was founded in 2010 as the NSC Minnesota Stars. In 2013, the club rebranded with a new crest and a new name, Minnesota United FC.  In 2010 when the club was founded, it began to play in North American Soccer League in the second tier of US Soccer. In March 2015, MLS announced that Minnesota United had been awarded an expansion spot in MLS. The team continued to compete in the NASL until the 2017 season when Minnesota United began to compete in MLS. This marked the introduction of top division soccer to Minnesota since the Minnesota Kicks dissolved in 1981. Minnesota United currently plays its home games at Allianz Field in Saint Paul. Minnesota United is nicknamed "the Loons" after Minnesota's state bird, the common loon. Notable players for Minnesota United include Kevin Molino, Darwin Quintero, Osvaldo Alonso, and Miguel Ibarra.

The Thunder were a USL First Division team founded in 1992 as an amateur men's team, then joined the USL in 1994, and won the championship of what was then the A-League in 1999. Notable former players include Tony Sanneh and Manuel Lagos.

The Minnesota Lightning were a W-League team founded in 2006. They also played at the National Sports Center. The team folded after the 2009 season.

The newest addition to Minnesota sports, the Minnesota Aurora FC are a USL W League team founded in 2021 and began play in May 2022.

Table of professional teams

Current teams

Former Minnesota teams

Other professional and semi-pro sports

Bandy
Bandy has been played on a regular basis in the United States since the early 1980s and the game is most popular in Minnesota, where the winter climate makes it possible to play outdoors for many months a year.

Most games in the American Bandy League are played at the Guidant John Rose Minnesota Oval and most of the national champions are teams from the state, like Minneapolis Bandolier, Dynamo Duluth, Minnesota Blades, and Sirius Minnesota. The Bandolier are the most successful team in the United States, having been crowned United States champions ten times as of 2014.

Guidant John Rose Minnesota Oval was also the main venue of the 1995 Bandy World Championship and the 2006 Women's Bandy World Championship. It will also host the 2016 Women's Bandy World Championship.

Lacrosse

The Minnesota Swarm were the state's professional lacrosse team from 2005 to 2015. All home games for the Minnesota Swarm were played at the Xcel Energy Center. The National Lacrosse League (NLL) awarded St. Paul the inactive Montreal Express franchise on August 10, 2004. After eleven seasons of mixed success playing in Minnesota, the Swarm left Minnesota for Georgia as they became the Georgia Swarm. Swarm owner John Arlotta cited difficulty negotiating a lease with the Xcel Energy Center, competition from other local sports teams, and decreasing ticket sales as reasons for the franchise's relocation.

Gaelic games
In the Twin Cities, which has always had a large Irish-American community, the Gaelic Athletic Association has a club named after Irish republican icon Robert Emmett. The club fields hurling, camogie, and Gaelic football teams. On August 2, 2019, the women of the Robert Emmets Hurling Club's Camogie team won the Silver Cup at the 2019 Gaelic Athletic Association World Games at Croke Park in Dublin.

Golf
Minnesota plays host to several professional golf events.  Beginning in 2019, the state will become host to the 3M Open, a PGA Tour event in Blaine. The new PGA Tour event will replace the PGA Tour Champions event that was hosted in Blaine annually since 1993.  What used to be the Burnett Senior Classic played at Bunker Hills is now the 3M Championship played at TPC Twin Cities in Blaine.  Minnesota was the host of the LPGA Classic from 1990 to 1998 at Edinburgh USA in Brooklyn Park.  The Nationwide Tour stops annually at Tom Lehman's Somerby Golf Club and Community in Byron.

The state has hosted several major events.  The U.S. Open has been played in the state four times, twice at Hazeltine National Golf Club in Chaska in 1970 and 1991, once at Interlachen Country Club in Edina (1930) in Bobby Jones' historic win, and once at The Minikahda Club in Minneapolis (1916).  Hazeltine played host to the PGA Championship in 2002 and 2009, and the Ryder Cup in 2016; it will host the Women's PGA Championship in 2019 and the Ryder Cup again in 2028. Keller Golf Course in Maplewood hosted the 1932 and 1954 PGA Championships, the 1949 Western Open, and the St. Paul Open from 1930 to 1968 (a regular PGA stop). Interlachen Country Club hosted the Solheim Cup in 2002 and the U.S. Women's Open in 2008.

Disc Golf
Disc golf courses in the Twin Cities play host to the Minnesota Majestic on the third weekend every June. It is part of the Professional Disc Golf Association's National Tour, the top level of pro/am disc golf events in America. The tournament has frequented Kaposia Park, Blue Ribbon Pines and Hyland Ski Area, among other courses. The 2010 Minnesota Majestic was the 23rd annual.

Ultimate Frisbee
The Minnesota Wind Chill were founded in 2013 as an expansion team for the American Ultimate Disc League (AUDL).  The team plays in the Midwestern Division of the AUDL.  Home games are played on the campus of Concordia University.
The Minnesota Strike were founded in 2020 as an expansion team for the Premier Ultimate League (PUL). Home games are played on the campus of Benilde-St. Margaret's.

Softball

Minnesota had a professional slow-pitch softball team from 1977 to 1979 called the Minnesota Goofy's and then the Minnesota Norsemen.  Former Viking Bob Lurtsema briefly played for the Norsemen. The Aussie Peppers was founded in 2018 and play in National Pro Fastpitch.

Motorsports

NASCAR
There are two racetracks in Minnesota that hold NASCAR sanctioned events. Elko Speedway in Elko is a 3/8 mile paved oval, which has held NASCAR events for over twenty years. Raceway Park (Minnesota) in Shakopee is a 1/4 mile paved oval.
NASCAR drivers from Minnesota include:
Joe Frasson – Ran several races in the 1970s, best career finish is third (three times)
Mike Garvey – NASCAR Camping World Truck Series driver
Jerick Johnson – NASCAR Camping World Truck Series driver
Brent Sherman – Ran six NASCAR Cup Series races in 2006
Blackie Wangerin – Best career finish was 13th
 Nick Lewis - 2009 Raceway Park Bomber Track Champion
 William Sawalich –  NASCAR Camping World Truck Series driver

NHRA

Minnesota is known for being the home of the Brainerd International Raceway, which opened in 1963.  It has hosted drag racing, road racing, and kart racing. NHRA drivers from Minnesota include:
Greg Anderson
Jason Line

Open Wheel
Perhaps the most successful driver from Minnesota is Tommy Milton.  Milton became the first driver to win two Indianapolis 500s with his wins in 1921 and 1923.  Amazingly, Milton was completely blind in his right eye.  In 2007 Rochester's Leilani Munter became the fourth woman in history to compete in the Indy Pro Series, the development league of IndyCar.

The aforementioned Brainerd International Raceway also hosts a 3-mile road course, which held a USAC race in 1969 among other events.

Rally
Rally America, based out of Golden Valley, holds an annual event in the woodlands near Bemidji. Known as the Ojibwe Forests Rally, the event is held near the end of August each year. Rally America also holds events in Michigan, Missouri, Oregon, Washington, Pennsylvania, Maine, and Colorado. X-Games superstar, Travis Pastrana, is a regular in the series.

World of Outlaws
There is a yearly World of Outlaws (WoO) sprint car event held at Princeton Raceway. Known as the PolyDome Princeton Nationals, the event is most likely held at the track due to WoO driver, Craig Dollansky, being from nearby Elk River. The 1/4 mile track leads to some exciting, action-packed racing.

Athletics
Minnesota has a long history with athletics which dates back to the early years as a state, when arena track racing and college track teams drew large crowds. As the cities and towns in the state of Minnesota grew in the 1890s, track and field events became popular at schools and colleges. The early Olympic competitions (especially the 1908 Summer Olympics) boosted the profile of the "marathon," a 26.2 mile road running distance, and Minnesota had its own runnings of the race before 1920.

Minnesota is often touted as one of the healthiest states in America, which coincides with its strong base of road runners and high participation numbers in local road races.  By the 1960s, future Olympian Ron Daws started the Land of Lakes Marathon in Minneapolis, which grew into the City of Lakes Marathon. Participation grew in the marathon while local smaller road races flourished. The City of Lakes grew into the Twin Cities Marathon, which first ran in 1982.

The success of Olympian Garry Bjorklund and the speed of Minnesota's own Boston Marathon-legend Dick Beardsley prompted more growth in the sport in the North country near Duluth where the Grandma's Marathon first ran in 1977. It was named after the restaurant on Canal Park, not the gender and age of finishers. The race posted some of the fastest times in the United States, and it drew international racing competition to the North Shore.

Now nearly every high school and college in the state offers cross-country and track and field teams for both genders. The state is also host to a team of distance running professionals training for national road races: the MN Distance Elite team (formerly known as Team USA Minnesota).

There are dozens of running clubs in the state, and they compete in a circuit of races known as the USATF Team Race Circuit.

Marathons
Today, there are eight Minnesota road marathons certified by United States Track and Field: 
 Grandma's Marathon (from Two Harbors to Duluth, founded 1977)
 Twin Cities Marathon (from Minneapolis to St. Paul, founded 1982, but preceded by the Land of Lakes Marathon [1963–1975], the City of Lakes Marathon [1976–1981] and the St. Paul Marathon [1981]). 
 Med City Marathon (in Rochester, founded 1996)
 Mankato Marathon (in Mankato, founded 2010)
 Lake Wobegon Trail Marathon (on paved trail from Holdingford to St. Joseph, founded 2008)
 Run for the Lakes Marathon (in Nisswa, founded 2008)
 Bemidji Blue Ox Marathon (in Bemidji, founded 2013)
 Ely Marathon (in Ely, Minnesota, founded 2015)

College
The state of Minnesota has 27 schools competing in the National Collegiate Athletic Association (NCAA).  Minnesota is one of eleven US states that do not have a school listed as a National Association of Intercollegiate Athletics (NAIA) member, though there are schools transitioning from the NAIA to the NCAA.

Division I

The Minnesota Golden Gophers compete in NCAA Division I as members of the Big Ten Conference for all sports except women's hockey, which the Big Ten sponsors only for men. In women's hockey, the school is a member of the NCAA Division I Western Collegiate Hockey Association (WCHA).  The Golden Gophers have won 28 total national collegiate championships, including 7 in football, 5 in men's hockey, 3 in baseball, 7 in women's hockey, 2 in men's basketball, 1 in men's golf, 1 in men's track and field, and 3 in men's wrestling. The entire list of collegiate national championships can be found here. The Golden Gophers have also won 178 conference titles. A list of notable former Golden Gophers can be found at Minnesota Golden Gophers#Notable Gopher athletes and coaches.

Four other universities in Minnesota also compete in NCAA Division I with teams competing nationally in ice hockey. The other Division I schools are Bemidji State University, Minnesota State University, Mankato (branded for sports purposes as Minnesota State), and St. Cloud State University and the University of Minnesota Duluth. All of these universities field both men's and women's teams. All four currently compete on the women's side of the WCHA, but have differing homes for their men's teams. Bemidji State and Minnesota State also compete on the men's side of the WCHA, while Minnesota–Duluth and St. Cloud State compete in the National Collegiate Hockey Conference (NCHC), which only operates a men's league. Duluth Bulldogs have won five Division I championships in women's ice hockey and two Division I championships in men's ice hockey. After the 2020–21 season, Bemidji State and Minnesota State will leave the men's WCHA to become inaugural members of the second Central Collegiate Hockey Association (CCHA). This league is the revival of a former Division I men's conference that had operated from 1971 to 2013.

In July 2021, the University of St. Thomas became the state's newest Division I school. The Tommies were expelled from their longtime Division III home of the Minnesota Intercollegiate Athletic Conference (MIAC), effective with the end of the 2020–21 school year, due to perceptions by most of the other MIAC members that they had grown too strong for the conference. St. Thomas soon received an invitation from the Summit League, a non-football Division I conference, to become a member effective upon its MIAC departure. St. Thomas eventually received a waiver of an NCAA rule mandating that Division III schools can only transition to Division II, allowing the school to move directly to D-I on the originally announced schedule. Of the school's 21 varsity sports, 18 participate in the Summit League. The football team plays in the Pioneer Football League, a football-only conference that competes in the second level of D-I football, the Football Championship Subdivision (FCS), thereby becoming the state's first FCS member. Men's hockey joined the revived CCHA, and women's hockey is in the WCHA.

Division II
The NCAA Division II teams in Minnesota primarily compete in the Northern Sun Intercollegiate Conference (NSIC).  There are 9 Division II classified schools for the 2017–2018 year. The NSIC was founded in 1932 and joined the NCAA in 1992. Teams competing in the NSIC are:
Bemidji State University – Beavers
Concordia University, St. Paul – Golden Bears
Minnesota State University, Mankato – Mavericks
Minnesota State University Moorhead – Dragons
Southwest Minnesota State University – Mustangs
St. Cloud State University – Huskies
University of Minnesota Crookston – Golden Eagles
University of Minnesota Duluth – Bulldogs
Winona State University – Warriors

Bemidji State, Minnesota Duluth, Minnesota State, and St. Cloud State notably compete in Division I in men's and women's hockey. All four are members of the women's WCHA; Bemidji State and Minnesota State are also members of the men's WCHA but set to move to the new CCHA in 2021, with Minnesota–Duluth and St. Cloud State competing in the NCHC.  Bemidji State University has won five NCAA Division II titles in men's hockey. Minnesota State has produced won 6 team and 49 individual national championships including men's hockey, women's softball. Minnesota Duluth has produced eight Division II and Division 1 titles, five in NCAA Division I Women's Hockey, one in NCAA Division I Men's Hockey, and two in NCAA Division II Football. Winona State has won two NCAA Division II in Men's Basketball titles. Concordia St. Paul has won nine NCAA Division II titles in Volleyball. Saint Cloud State was won two NCAA Division II titles in Wrestling. Minnesota Crookston, MSU Moorhead, and Southwest Minnesota State have not won any NCAA team titles.

Division III
The NCAA Division III teams in Minnesota play in one of two leagues, the Minnesota Intercollegiate Athletic Conference (MIAC) or the Upper Midwest Athletic Conference (UMAC).

Teams competing in the MIAC:
Augsburg University – Auggies
Bethel University – Royals
Carleton College – Knights
Concordia College, Moorhead – Cobbers
Gustavus Adolphus College – Gusties
Hamline University – Pipers
Macalester College – Scots
College of Saint Benedict – Blazers (women only)
St. Catherine University – Wildcats (women only)
St. John's University – Johnnies (men only)
St. Mary's University – Cardinals
St. Olaf College – Oles

The MIAC was founded in 1920.  Conference schools have won 30 total NCAA titles.

Teams competing in the UMAC:

Bethany Lutheran College – Vikings
Crown College – Storm
Martin Luther College – Knights
University of Minnesota Morris – Cougars
North Central University – Rams
University of Northwestern - St. Paul – Eagles
College of St. Scholastica – Saints
 St. Scholastica will leave the UMAC after the 2020–21 school year and replace St. Thomas in the MIAC.

The UMAC was founded in 1972.  The conference became an active NCAA Division III conference July 1, 2008.  There are nine full members, seven from Minnesota.  All seven Minnesota members are full Division III members.

Olympians from Minnesota
The United States hockey team won the Olympic gold medal for ice hockey in 1980, coached by Minnesota native Herb Brooks. Eleven of the twenty players on the roster were from Minnesota. The team beat the long-dominant Soviet team in what has been called the Miracle on Ice, and went on to win the gold medal by defeating Finland.

The 1960 United States hockey team won the Olympic gold medal in the 1960 Winter Olympics. Six of the 18 members of that team were from Minnesota. The team beat the Canadian ice hockey team in the final game to secure the gold medal.
A substantial number of players on the 1956 Olympic silver medal hockey team came from Minnesota. The 1948 Winter Olympics had a native Thief River Falls, MN member on the team.
The majority of players on the 1972 Olympic silver medal hockey team came from Minnesota.

In the 2006 Winter Olympics, both the bronze medal U.S. men's and the women's curling teams came from the Bemidji Curling Club.

Bloomington native Tom Malchow won a gold medal at the 2000 Summer Olympics and a silver medal at the 1996 Summer Olympics in swimming.

Carrie Tollefson was on the 2004 Summer Olympic team as a distance runner and ranked 5th in 2006.

Minnesota was well represented in the 2008 Summer Olympics in Bejiing,
including Sada Jacobson (Rochester, Minnesota) already had won the bronze medal in the 2004 Summer Olympic games in sabre fencing.

Minnesota Lynx players were part of six consecutive and eight overall victories in women's basketball. Seimone Augustus, Sylvia Fowles, Maya Moore, Lindsay Whalen, and Katie Smith were among those who earned Team USA their gold medals.

Amateur sports

Baseball
Summer collegiate baseball is present in Minnesota with the SCBA-sanctioned Northwoods League.  All players in the league must have NCAA eligibility remaining in order to participate, and therefore are not paid. Minnesota's Northwoods League teams are the Duluth Huskies, Mankato Moondogs, Rochester Honkers, St. Cloud Rox, and Willmar Stingers. The Northwoods League Offices are located in Rochester, Minnesota. There are also Northwoods League teams operating in Wisconsin, Iowa, Michigan, and Ontario, Canada.

The Fargo-Moorhead RedHawks are an American Association team founded in 1996 and based in Fargo, North Dakota. While not primarily based in Minnesota the team also includes fans from Moorhead, Minnesota. They won five Northern League titles in 1998, 2003, 2006, 2009 and 2010 (the last year of the league).

Other Minor League Baseball teams associated with Minnesota include the Rochester Red Wings (AAA), the New Britain Rock Cats (AA), the Fort Myers Miracles (High-A), the Cedar Rapids Kernels (Low-A), the Elizabethton Twins (Rookie), the DSL Twins of the Dominican Summer League, and GCL Twins of the Gulf Coast League, all sponsored by the Minnesota Twins.

American Legion baseball is played throughout the state in summer.

Golf
Minnesota has more golfers per capita than any state in the U.S. Hazeltine National Golf Club played host to the 2006 U.S. Amateur.

Curling
In addition to the Bemidji Curling Club whose members competed in the 2006 Winter Olympics, there are over two dozen curling clubs in the state.

Roller derby
The Twin Cities is home to Minnesota Roller Derby (Saint Paul), North Star Roller Derby (Minneapolis) and Twin Cities Roller Derby (Minneapolis), as well as two junior derby leagues, Minnesota Junior Roller Derby (MNJRD) and Minnesota Frostbite.

Minnesota Roller Derby was founded in 2004 as the Minnesota RollerGirls, and were the fourth flat-track league to host a bout. Their venue for the first season was a roller rink in a northern Minneapolis suburb. After selling out all four bouts in their first season, they were approached by the City of Saint Paul, which connected them with the Roy Wilkins Auditorium, part of the RiverCentre Complex, making them the first modern roller derby league to play in a professional sports venue, and their first sellout set the modern roller derby attendance record of 4,900 (which was beaten the next month by the Rat City Rollergirls of Seattle, who had recently begun playing in the 15,000-seat KeyArena). The Minnesota RollerGirls are founding members of the Women's Flat-Track Derby Association (WFTDA), the main governing body for flat track roller derby, and have advanced to the WFTDA Championships in 2006, 2010, 2011, and 2012. Minnesota Roller Derby's training organization includes the adult training team Minnesota Windchill (formerly Debu-Taunts) and junior training team Minnesota Frostbite.

North Star Roller Derby was founded in 2006 as North Star Roller Girls, and played in a roller rink for two seasons before moving to the Minneapolis Convention Center. They joined the WFTDA in 2009, and competed in the North Central Regional Tournament in 2009 and 2010. In 2015, their primary venue changed to the Lee and Rose Warner Coliseum at the Minnesota State Fairgrounds, where they remain. Their secondary venues include Canterbury Park in Shakopee, Minnesota and the Minneapolis Convention Center. The league rebranded to North Star Roller Derby in 2017.

TCRD and MNJRD play in various venues around the Twin Cities. Twin Cities Roller Derby was founded in 2009 as Minnesota Men's Roller Derby, and rebranded in 2018.

Soccer
Every year in summer (generally in July) at Blaine's National Sports Center the Schwan's USA CUP is played. It is the largest international youth soccer tournament in North America with over 1,000 teams and participants from 22 countries.

The National Premier Soccer League expanded into Minnesota with a new division within the Midwest Conference called the NPSL North. This new division incorporates existing NPSL teams with expansion sides. NPSL North incorporates teams from the Minnesota as well as North Dakota, South Dakota, and Wisconsin. Minnesota teams include Duluth FC, Minneapolis City SC, Minnesota Twin Stars FC, Rochester Med City FC, and Viejos Son Los Trapos FC. The Inaugural season of NPSL North kicked off in 2017 with 8 teams.

Formed in 1953, the Minnesota Amateur Soccer League is one of several adult amateur soccer leagues in the state. MASL is considered the top sanctioned adult league, which features four divisions using the promotion-relegation system.

Bandy
Bandy in the USA is almost exclusively a Minnesota sport. All league matches are played on the largest artificial ice surface of the Western Hemisphere, Guidant John Rose Minnesota Oval in Roseville, venue of the 1995 Bandy World Championship and the 2006 Women's Bandy World Championship and 2016 Women's Bandy World Championship, even by the team from Duluth. Also rink bandy competitions are organized. The United States national bandy team is typically the 6th or the 7th best team in the world, thus often having finished either last in Group A or winning Group B of the Bandy World Championship. At the 2012 tournament they were praised for being better than ever before. However, it was not enough to avoid being relegated to Group B. With an increasing number of participating countries, from the 2014 tournament there are 8 countries in Group A, almost securing USA a permanent place for the foreseeable future.

References

External links

Minnesota Timberwolves
Minnesota Twins
Minnesota United FC
Minnesota Vikings
Minnesota Wild